Parliamentary privilege in the United Kingdom is a legal immunity enjoyed by members of the House of Commons and House of Lords designed to ensure that parliamentarians are able to carry out their duties free from interference. The privileges are freedom of speech, freedom from arrest on civil matters, freedom of access to the sovereign, and that 'the most favourable construction should be placed on all the Houses' proceedings'. Fair and accurate reporting of the proceedings of parliament is also protected by parliamentary privilege.

Parliamentary privilege is, however, something that forms part of the law rather than putting Members of Parliament above the law: for example, the MPs Chris Huhne and Fiona Onasanya were both successfully convicted of non-parliamentary criminal offenses in the 2010s; and the 2010 Supreme Court case R v Chaytor, argued in the wake of the parliamentary expenses scandal, ruled that MPs were not immune to prosecution for crimes such as fraud conducted in relation to their parliamentary activities.

Components
Parliamentary privilege has two main components:
Freedom of speech as guaranteed by the Bill of Rights, but also without any possible defamation claims. An example of this is when, in 2018, Labour peer Lord Hain named Sir Philip Green as the person at the centre of allegations of sexual and racial harassment.
Exclusive cognisance, the freedom of Parliament to control its own internal affairs.

History
The doctrine was first enshrined in law after the Glorious Revolution following the passage of the Bill of Rights 1689. Prior to the Bill of Rights, Parliament had no statutory protection, but nevertheless asserted both the freedom of speech and freedom from arrest, especially against what they perceived to be tyrannical acts by the king. One of the flashpoints that led to the English Civil War was the attempted arrest by King Charles I of the Five Members for treason, which Parliament viewed as being in violation of its ancient liberties.  

Lewis Namier gives a number of examples of criminals escaping prosecution, public officials escaping censure and bankrupts escaping creditors, claiming that it was a significant reason for many men to try to become MPs.

After the case of Stockdale v Hansard (1839) found that Hansard, although ordered by Parliament to publish transcripts of its debates, did not enjoy the protection of parliamentary privilege, Parliament immediately passed the Parliamentary Papers Act 1840, which gave absolute civil or criminal immunity to papers published by order of Parliament, and qualified immunity to any publication outside of Parliament that published extracts from Hansard without malice.

Examples 
There are multiple modern examples of Members exercising the right to parliamentary privilege, most notably related to freedom of speech and immunity from prosecution.

 In November 2008, Damian Green, a Conservative MP, who was arrested on suspicion of aiding and abetting misconduct in a public office and had his offices searched. Labour MP Denis MacShane argued parliamentary privilege should have granted him protection from that arrest.
 In October 2009, Paul Farrelly submitted a written parliamentary question regarding a so-called "super-injunction" against The Guardian newspaper which prevented them from naming Trafigura as the company responsible for the 2006 Ivory Coast toxic waste dump, and the efforts by legal firm Carter-Ruck to prevent The Guardian from reporting on the question or even the existence of the injunction.
 In May 2011, John Hemming exercised parliamentary privilege to name footballer Ryan Giggs as the litigant involved in the case CTB v News Group Newspapers. Giggs had applied for a super-injunction in England and Wales to prevent reporting by The Sun of his extramarital affair, but his failure to apply for an injunction in Scotland led to the information being widely known after it was published by the Sunday Herald.
 In February 2022, Layla Moran used parliamentary privilege to name 35 people who she claimed were Russian oligarchs, arguing that they should be sanctioned due to their closeness to Russia's president during the Russo-Ukrainian war.

Select committees
Witnesses to Parliamentary select committees also enjoy Parliamentary privilege if their evidence is formally accepted.

Case law
Strode's Case (1512)
The Case of the Five Members (1641)
Ashby v White (1703)
R v Paty (1705)
Stockdale v Hansard (1837)
Bradlaugh v Gossett (1840)
The Case of the Sheriff of Middlesex (1840)
Pepper v Hart (1993)
R v Chaytor (2010)

Legislation
Parliamentary Privilege Act 1770

Scotland, Wales and Northern Ireland 
Members of the Scottish Parliament do not have parliamentary privilege, however the Scotland Act 1998 incorporates a number of legal protections for parliamentary debate and reporting, including absolute privilege for the purpose of the law of defamation, limits to the remedies which can be ordered by courts against the Parliament in civil cases, and qualified protection from strict liability contempt under the Contempt of Court Act 1981.

Equivalent protections apply to proceedings of the Welsh and Northern Irish Assembles under the Government of Wales Act 2006 and the Northern Ireland Act 1998.

See also
Absolute privilege in English law
English defamation law

References

Further reading
Loveland, I. (2012) 'Constitutional Law, Administrative Law, and Human Rights: A Critical Introduction, Chapter 8

External links
Parliamentary privilege - UK Constitutional Law Group

English defamation law
Parliamentary procedure
Constitution of the United Kingdom